The Texas Tech Red Raiders men's and women's golf teams represents Texas Tech University, often referred to as Texas Tech. The teams compete as members of the Big 12 Conference in the National Collegiate Athletic Association (NCAA).

Head coaches

Men

 Jay McClure 1959- 1964 
Gene Mitchell (1967–70 and 1981–83)
Danny Mason (1971–78)
Richard Whittenburg (1979–80)
Greg Reynolds (1984–85)
Tommy Wilson (1986–98)
Jeff Mitchell (1999–2000)
Greg Sands (2001–present)

Women
Jay McClure (1977–90)
Jeff Mitchell (1990–2000)
Stacy Totman (2000–09)
JoJo Robertson (2010–present)

Championships

Men
Border Intercollegiate Athletic Association (Border Conference): 1936, 1937, 1939, 1955
Southwest Conference (SWC): 1959, 1971, 1996

The Rawls Course

The Rawls Course, home of the Red Raiders golf teams, is located on the Texas Tech campus. Alumnus Jerry S. Rawls donated $8.6 million toward the total cost of approximately $15 million course. Completed in September 2003, the course features an 18-hole course,  driving range, pitching and chipping areas and an indoor facility containing three hitting bays. The Rawls Course was designed by Tom Doak of Renaissance Golf Design, Inc., Traverse City, Michigan. Starting from just a cotton field, the course was created to imitate the land east and south of Lubbock, where the Great Plains suddenly begin falling into the valleys and canyons that lead to the Caprock region. Lubbock's strong prevailing winds figured prominently in the course's final design. Both Golf Week and Turfnet magazines ranked The Rawls Course as the third best collegiate course in the United States. Golf Magazine ranked it as the second most affordable U.S. course and placed it twenty-third on their list of top 50 golf courses in the nation for $50 or less.

References

External links
 Official Texas Tech Men's Golf website
 Official Texas Tech Women's Golf website